Deni Avdija (born 3 January 2001) is an Israeli professional basketball player for the Washington Wizards of the National Basketball Association (NBA). He plays the small forward position.

The son of former basketball player Zufer Avdija, he started playing basketball in the fourth grade for his hometown club Bnei Herzeliya, and then in 2013 for Maccabi Tel Aviv. He excelled as a youth player. He debuted for their senior team in 2017, at age 16, becoming the youngest player in club history. Two years later, he became the youngest player to ever win the Israeli Basketball Premier League MVP award, and led his team to the Israeli Basketball Premier League championship.

In 2020, Avdija declared for the NBA draft, and was drafted by the Washington Wizards. He is also a member of the Israeli senior national basketball team. He has won two gold medals for Israel at the youth level, including at the 2019 FIBA U20 European Championship, where he was named tournament's most valuable player.

Early life and youth career
Avdija was born in kibbutz of Beit Zera, where his mother is from (of ethnic Jewish descent). His father Zufer Avdija (of ethnic Gorani–Muslim descent) played for the Yugoslavia national team prior to moving to Israel to play for various local Israeli teams.

He played association football until he entered fourth grade, when his friend and teammate Itamar Vule convinced him to try basketball because of his height. He started focusing more on basketball. In 2013, he joined the youth ranks of Maccabi Tel Aviv, where he played under the coach Shai Omer. From 2017 to 2019, Avdija led Maccabi Tel Aviv to three consecutive Israeli youth state championships. In August 2018, he participated in Basketball Without Borders Europe in Belgrade, where he was named camp MVP.

Avdija initially competed at the youth level for Bnei Herzliya, and in January 2019, Avdija played for Maccabi Tel Aviv's U18 team at the Adidas Next Generation Tournament (ANGT) in Munich. He was selected to the all-tournament team after leading the event with 24.3 points, 6 assists, and 3.8 steals per game and a Performance Index Rating (PIR) of 31.5. Avdija also ranked second among all players with 11 rebounds per game, while helping his team finish in second place. In February 2019, at the NBA All-Star Weekend in Charlotte, North Carolina, Avdija was named MVP of the Basketball Without Borders Global Camp. In May, he joined Maccabi Tel Aviv's U18 team for the ANGT Finals. He collected all-tournament team honours after leading the event with 24.7 points and 12 rebounds per game with a PIR of 29.7, while ranking second with 6.7 assists per game.

Professional career

Maccabi Tel Aviv (2017–2020)
On 5 November 2017, Avdija started his professional career with Israeli club Maccabi Tel Aviv, signing a six-year deal with the club. On 19 November, he made his professional debut in the 2017–18 Israeli Basketball Premier League, playing three minutes against Ironi Nes Ziona. At 16 years and 320 days of age, he became the youngest player to ever play for his club's senior team. Avdija made his EuroLeague debut on 22 November 2018, at the age of 17, in a 74–70 loss to Fenerbahçe. He scored two points in three minutes of playing time.

On 24 October 2019, at the age of 18, Avdija made his first start in the EuroLeague, recording six points and three rebounds in 16 minutes in a 76–63 victory over Valencia. On 11 January 2020, Avdija recorded a then career-high of 22 points, shooting 9-of-15 from the field, with five assists in a 94–83 win over Hapoel Holon. On 31 January, Avdija was named Israeli Player of the Month in the Israeli Basketball Premier League after averaging 14.5 points, 5.3 rebounds, and 2.5 assists per game, with an 18.3 PIR, in four games played that month. On 1 February, Avdija established a new career-high of 26 points, shooting 9-of-12 from the field, and grabbed six rebounds in an 86–81 loss to Hapoel Eilat. Six days later, he scored 13 points, including eight in the second quarter, in a 78–77 victory over Fenerbahçe. His dunk over Luigi Datome during the game would be named EuroLeague Magic Moment of the Season in July 2020. On 16 April, Avdija declared for the 2020 NBA draft.

Avdija's season was suspended for about three months due to the COVID-19 pandemic. He returned to action on 21 June, recording 23 points, seven rebounds, and five assists in 24 minutes in a 114–82 win over Maccabi Ashdod. On 23 July, he scored 22 points, including 10 in the fourth quarter, and grabbed 10 rebounds in an 83–68 win over Hapoel Tel Aviv, helping Maccabi Tel Aviv advance to the Israeli Basketball Premier League Final Four. In the Final on 28 July, Avdija recorded five points, seven rebounds, four assists, and two steals to help Maccabi Tel Aviv defeat Maccabi Rishon LeZion, 86–81. He became the youngest player to ever win the Israeli League MVP award. Avdija was also named Israeli League Israeli Player of the Year and was an All-Israeli League First Team selection. He finished the season averaging 12.9 points, 6.3 rebounds, and 2.7 assists per game in the Israeli Basketball Premier League. In the EuroLeague, Avdija averaged four points, 2.6 rebounds, and 1.2 assists in 14.3 minutes per game.

Washington Wizards (2020–present)

Avdija was selected with the ninth overall pick in the 2020 NBA draft by the Washington Wizards. He was projected as a consensus top 5 pick on draft night but slipped. He signed a rookie contract with the Wizards on 1 December 2020.

On 9 January 2021, Avdija recorded a career-high 20 points and hit five three-pointers, along with five rebounds, five assists, and two steals in a 128–124 loss against the Miami Heat. On 21 April, Avdija suffered a right ankle fracture during a 118–114 win against the Golden State Warriors.

On 14 February 2022, Avdija set a then career high in rebounds with 15 in a 103–94 loss against the Detroit Pistons. During the 2021–22 season, Avdija played all 82 games, while averaging 8.4 points, 5.2 rebounds, and 2.0 assists per game.

On 11 January, 2023, Avdija set a career high in rebounds with 20 in a 100–97 win against the Chicago Bulls.

On 30 January, 2023, Avdija set a career high in points with 25 in a 127–109 win against the San Antonio Spurs.

Israeli national team career

Junior national team
Although he had also been eligible to represent Serbia internationally, due to his father's background, Avdija chose to play for Israel because he had friends there and was more familiar with its language. He competed for Israel at the 2017 FIBA U16 European Championship in Podgorica. Avdija led the tournament with 12.6 rebounds and 5.3 assists per game, to go with 15.3 points per game.

In April 2018, Avdija averaged over 17 points and nine rebounds for Israel at the Albert Schweitzer Tournament, an under-18 competition in Mannheim. In July 2018, he played at the FIBA U20 European Championship in Chemnitz, leading Israel to a gold medal. Avdija averaged 12.7 points, 6.4 rebounds, 1.1 assists and 1.3 steals per game, while earning a spot on the all-tournament team with teammate Yovel Zoosman. Later that month, Avdija competed at the FIBA U18 European Championship Division B in Skopje. Appearing tired from his previous tournament and lacking in endurance, he averaged 17.3 points, 7.4 rebounds, 3 assists and 1.4 steals per game.

In July 2019, Avdija led Israel to a second straight gold medal at the FIBA U20 European Championship in Tel Aviv. He averaged 18.4 points, 8.3 rebounds, 5.3 assists, 2.4 blocks, and 2.1 steals per game, earning MVP and all-tournament team accolades, as the second-youngest player at the event. Avdija tallied 26 points, 11 rebounds and 5 steals against France in the semifinal, before recording 23 points, 7 assists, 5 rebounds, and 3 blocks against Spain in the final.

Senior national team
On 21 February 2019, Avdija made his debut for the Israeli senior national team, in an 81–77 win over Germany, during the 2019 FIBA World Cup qualification stage. On 24 February 2020, he recorded 21 points and eight rebounds in 24 minutes in an 87–63 victory over Romania during the EuroBasket 2021 qualifiers.

His free throw shooting is not as strong as his otherwise versatile game; in 59 games for Maccabi, he averaged 59% from the free throw line and 33% from the 3-point zone.

Personal life
His father Zufer Avdija was born in Pristina, Yugoslavia, and is a Serbian–Israeli citizen of Gorani–Muslim heritage. A professional basketball player in Yugoslavia and Israel, Zufer spent 11 years of his playing career with Crvena zvezda and was the team's captain in the 1980s, before moving to the Israeli Premier League in the 1990s and playing 8 seasons for Israeli clubs Ramat HaSharon, Rishon LeZion, Hapoel Tel Aviv, and Elitzur Bat Yam. He also represented the Yugoslavian national team internationally, with whom he won the bronze medal at the 1982 FIBA World Championship. Avdija's mother, Sharon Artzi, an Israeli Jew from kibbutz of Beit Zera, is a former track and field athlete and basketball player.

Avdija holds dual citizenship of Israel and Serbia, the latter because his father is a Serbian citizen. When he turned 18 years old, he received a deferment from mandatory service in the Israel Defense Forces (IDF) due to his basketball career. On 1 April 2020, while the basketball season was suspended as a result of the COVID-19 pandemic, Avdija was drafted into the IDF for a short service.

In the 2020 NBA draft interview, Avdija said that "My dad is Zufer Avdija. He was born in Kosovo, Serbia. He was a basketball player for the Yugoslav national team and several teams in Israel", appearing with a lapel pin of Israeli and Serbian flags. He has said he learned to speak English by playing video games, as well as by watching Nickelodeon sitcoms.

Career statistics

NBA

|-
| style="text-align:left;"|
| style="text-align:left;"|Washington
| 54 || 32 || 23.3 || .417 || .315 || .644 || 4.9 || 1.2 || .6 || .3 || 6.3
|-
| style="text-align:left;"|
| style="text-align:left;"|Washington
| style="background:#cfecec;"|82* || 8 || 24.2 || .432 || .317 || .757 || 5.2 || 2.0 || .7 || .5 || 8.4
|- class="sortbottom"
| style="text-align:center;" colspan="2"|Career
| 136 || 40 || 23.8 || .426 || .316 || .729 || 5.1 || 1.7 || .7 || .4 || 7.6

EuroLeague
Source: euroleague.net

|-
| style="text-align:left;"|2018–19
| style="text-align:left;" rowspan="2"|Maccabi Tel Aviv
| 8 || 0 || 6.4 || .444 || .500 || 1.000 || 1.5 || .3 || .1 || .0 || 3.9 || 3.0
|-
| style="text-align:left;"|2019–20
| 26 || 5 || 14.3 || .436 || .277 || .556 || 2.6 || 1.2 || .4 || .2 || 4.0 || 3.9
|- class="sortbottom"
| style="text-align:center;" colspan="2"|Career
| 34 || 5 || 12.4 || .438 || .316 || .600 || 2.4 || .9 || .3 || .2 || 4.0 || 3.5

See also
List of select Jewish basketball players

References

External links

 Euroleague profile
 FIBA Europe Under-20 profile

2001 births
Living people
Gorani people
Israeli Jews
Shooting guards
Small forwards
Israeli men's basketball players
Israeli people of Kosovan descent
Israeli people of Serbian descent
Jewish men's basketball players
Maccabi Tel Aviv B.C. players
National Basketball Association players from Israel
National Basketball Association players from Serbia
Sportspeople from Herzliya
Serbian men's basketball players
Serbian people of Jewish descent
Serbian people of Kosovan descent
Washington Wizards draft picks
Washington Wizards players